Valnesfjord Church is a parish church of the Church of Norway in Fauske Municipality in Nordland county, Norway. It is located in the village of Straumsnes. It is the church for the Valnesfjord parish which is part of the Salten prosti (deanery) in the Diocese of Sør-Hålogaland. The white, wooden church was built in a long church style in 1905 using plans drawn up by the architect K. Tessem. The church seats about 250 people. The building was consecrated on 14 June 1905 the Bishop Peter Wilhelm Bøckman.

Media gallery

See also
List of churches in Sør-Hålogaland

References

Fauske
Churches in Nordland
Wooden churches in Norway
20th-century Church of Norway church buildings
Churches completed in 1905
1905 establishments in Norway
Long churches in Norway